Carryl Thomas (born 17 May 1977) is an English actress,  known for her roles as Kelly Boulter on the Channel 5 soap opera, Family Affairs (2003–2005) and Cara Robinson on the ITV soap opera Emmerdale (2020).

Filmography

Stage

References

External links
 
 

21st-century English actresses
Alumni of the Mountview Academy of Theatre Arts
English film actresses
English soap opera actresses
English stage actresses
English television actresses
Living people
1977 births